"Way Less Sad" is a song by American pop band AJR. It was released on February 17, 2021 via S-Curve Records as the fourth single from the band's fourth studio album OK Orchestra.

Composition and content
AJR created the song in the living room of their apartment in New York.  In an interview with ABC News Radio, they said, "So much of last year felt apocalyptic and this year we can finally see the light at the end of the tunnel. Things aren't back to normal yet but we should be celebrating the small wins, even if they seem trivial."

"Way Less Sad" is a happy pop song with lyrics that describe the path of discussing mental health.
The song features a trumpet with an upbeat tempo, sampled from Simon and Garfunkel’s “My Little Town”.

Music video
The official music video was released on February 17, 2021. They performed at a number of New York City well-known locations, including the TWA terminal at the John F. Kennedy International Airport and Jane's Carousel in Brooklyn. The video is AJR's fastest growing YouTube video, grossing over 18 million views as of June 2022.

Other uses
The song, along with Bummerland, was used in American baseball promotions for ESPN as their official anthem for the 2021 Major League Baseball season.

Charts

Weekly charts

Year-end charts

Certifications

References

AJR (band) songs
2021 songs
2021 singles
Songs written by Paul Simon
Pop ballads